The 2013 UEFA European Under-21 Championship qualification was a series of parallel association football competitions held over 2011 and 2012 to decide the qualifiers for 2013 UEFA European Under-21 Championship, to be held in Israel. The draw for the qualifying rounds was held on 3 February 2011 in Nyon, with matches played between March 2011 and September 2012.

There were ten groups. Two of these groups had six teams; the remaining eight groups consisted of five teams. Group competition was a double round robin: each team hosted a game with every other team in its group. At the conclusion of qualifying, the team at the top of each group and four best second-placed teams qualified for the two-legged play-offs  scheduled in October 2012, with the winner of each play-off tie qualifying for the finals.

Seeds
A total of fifty-two participating teams were divided in five draw pots based on the UEFA Under-21 coefficient ranking. Pots A through D contained ten teams, while pot E twelve teams.

The UEFA executive committee has decided on its meeting on 27 January 2011 to have Bosnia and Herzegovina and Ukraine seeded in groups of six to avoid any group of five to potentially be reduced to four or three teams as a result of hypothetical suspension.

Before the draw UEFA confirmed that, for political reasons, Armenia would not be drawn against Azerbaijan (due to the dispute concerning territory of Nagorno-Karabakh) and Georgia would not be drawn against Russia (due to the dispute regarding the territory of South Ossetia) in the qualifiers for  2013 UEFA European Under–21 Football Championship.

Tiebreakers
If two or more teams are equal on points on completion of the group matches, the following criteria are applied to determine the rankings.
 Higher number of points obtained in the group matches played among the teams in question
 Superior goal difference from the group matches played among the teams in question
 Higher number of goals scored in the group matches played among the teams in question
 Higher number of goals scored away from home in the group matches played among the teams in question
 If, after applying criteria 1) to 4) to several teams, two or more teams still have an equal ranking, the criteria 1) to 4) will be reapplied to determine the ranking of these teams. If this procedure does not lead to a decision, criteria 6) and 7) will apply
 Results of all group matches:
 Superior goal difference
 Higher number of goals scored
 Higher number of goals scored away from home
 Position in the UEFA Under-21 coefficient ranking used for the group stage draw

Qualifying group stage

Group 1

Group 2

Group 3

Group 4

Group 5

Group 6

Group 7

Group 8

Group 9

Group 10

Ranking of second-placed teams
Because some groups contain six teams and some five, matches against the sixth-placed team in each group are not included in this ranking. As a result, eight matches played by each team will count for the purposes of the second-placed table.

Tiebreakers
The following criteria were applied to determine the rankings.
 Higher number of points obtained in these matches
 Superior goal difference from these matches
 Higher number of goals scored in these matches
 Higher number of away goals scored in these matches
 Position in the UEFA Under-21 coefficient ranking used for the group stage draw

Play-offs

The play-offs for the tournament finals were held between 11 and 16 October 2012. The seven winners qualified for the final tournament in Israel.

Seedings
The draw for the play-offs was held on 14 September 2012 in Nyon to determine the seven pairings as well as the order of the home and away ties. The seven group winners with the highest competition coefficients have been seeded and those teams were drawn against the unseeded teams. Nations from the same group could not be drawn against each other.

Each nation's coefficient was generated by calculating:
40% of the average ranking points per game earned in the 2013 UEFA European Under-21 Championship qualifying group stage.
40% of the average ranking points per game earned in the 2011 UEFA European Under-21 Championship qualifying stage and final tournament.
20% of the average ranking points per game earned in the 2009 UEFA European Under-21 Championship qualifying stage and final tournament.

The seedings are as follows:

Matches

|}

Top goalscorers
The top scorers in the 2013 UEFA European Under-21 Championship qualification were as follows. Players in italics have also played in the play-offs.

References

External links
Official site

 
Qualification
Qual
UEFA European Under-21 Championship qualification